Alperton Community School is a coeducational secondary school and sixth form with academy status. It has a specialism in maths, computing and arts and it is located in the Alperton area of the London Borough of Brent, England. It has approximately 1750 students. The school converted to Cooperative Academy status in September 2012.

The school is divided into two sites: the lower school on Ealing Road near Alperton Underground station, consisting of Years 7, 8 and 9 and the upper school on Stanley Avenue, consisting of Years 10, 11, 12 and 13. The lower school has recently been renovated.

In 2018, Andria Zafirakou, an Arts and Textiles teacher at Alperton Community School was awarded the Global Teacher Prize 2018.

July 2016 the Ofsted report judged the school to be “Good with Outstanding Leadership and Management”.

History

In 1922, Alperton Hall mansion was purchased in order to support the educational needs of the growing industrial town and opened with the overseeing headmaster Mr Edmund Lightley. In 1928 the school adopted the name Wembley County Grammar School and the original mansion was demolished in 1938 to allow for a new appropriate site to be built for a traditional grammar school.

A separate school on Ealing Road named Alperton County Mixed School was developed in 1948 on a new site near Alperton tube station on Kennedy's Farm which required the demolition of the adjacent Joy Cottages sitting alongside the station. The requirement grew from the previous local school named Alperton School, which had existed since 1876 on a site now hosting the Shree Sanatan Hindu temple, becoming inappropriate due to the Education Act of 1944 and the increased demand because of area growth. In 1957 the school was split into Alperton Boys and Alperton Girls both being shaped into secondary moderns with Mr T. Hostler as headmaster for boys and Miss J. Dawson head teacher for girls respectively, although officially the girls site was not completed until 1962.

The three schools, Wembley County Grammar, Alperton Boys, and Alperton Girls were amalgamated as to form Alperton High School in 1967.
 Mr Roy Innes was recruited as the headmaster to see through the new comprehensive school merger and development and after a decade retired in 1977.

During the early 1990s through the Local Management of Schools (LMS) initiative the school took control over its own finances and in 1993 was renamed Alperton Community School. From 1991, Mr Pankaj Gulab as Deputy Head saw through the change to a local managed school and in 1992 he became the headmaster.

Notable staff
The 2018 Global Teacher Prize  was awarded to Andria Zafirakou, an Arts and Textiles teacher at the school.

Notable alumni
Ron Greenwood (1932–35), England Football manager and player
James Saunders (1936–41), English playwright
Ken Norris (1947–52), English cross country runner
Nicky Hopkins (1955–59), English pianist and organist 
Keith Moon (1957–58), Drummer for The Who
Merle Amory (1969–74), London Councillor and first black leader of a British local authority
Dale Banton (1972–77), English footballer
Gary Waddock (1973–78), Football manager and player
Paul Leyshon (1988–93), English actor
 Dr Jason Seewoodhary (1990–97), pioneering doctor and leading medical academic

References 

Brent secondary school falls from 'outstanding' to 'requires improvement' following conversion to academy

External links
 Official Website
 Official Old Alpertonians Group

Secondary schools in the London Borough of Brent
Academies in the London Borough of Brent